The Grande Prémio Internacional de Torres Vedras – Troféu Joaquim Agostinho is a road bicycle racing stage race held annually in the Torres Vedras, Portugal. Since 2005, it has been organised as a 2.1 event on the UCI Europe Tour.

Winners

External links
 

Cycle races in Portugal
UCI Europe Tour races
Recurring sporting events established in 1978
1978 establishments in Portugal
Sport in Torres Vedras
Summer events in Portugal